2021–22 UAE Division Two is the third season of the third tier Emirati football league. This season sees only 12 teams enter as Abtal Al Khaleej and Dubai City were promoted to the UAE First Division League and Al Dar Collage withdrew from the competition.

Clubs and stadiums

League table

Results

Season statistics

Top Scorers
As of 17 April 2022

Number of teams by Emirates

References

2021–22 in Emirati football